The ember parrotfish (Scarus rubroviolaceus) is a species of marine ray-finned fish, a parrotfish, in the family Scaridae. It is native to the Indian and Pacific Oceans. It is also known as the bicolor parrotfish and the redlip parrotfish.

Distribution
The ember parrotfish is widespread and abundant. It has been found in the Indian and Pacific Oceans, with its range including Japan, eastern Africa, and the Hawaiian islands.

Description
The species is sexually dimorphic, with the males possessing a bright, greenish-blue color while the females are a duller brown.

Habitat and behavior
Diet includes aquatic plants and benthic algae, which they scrape off rocks using their beak.

Importance to humans
The ember parrotfish is commercially fished, and can be kept in saltwater aquariums.

Etymology
The genus name, Scarus, comes from the Greek word "skaros", meaning "parrotfish".

References

External links
 

ember parrotfish
Taxa named by Pieter Bleeker
ember parrotfish